Mikhail Biarnadski (born 10 January 1977) is a boxer from Belarus.

He participated in the 2004 Summer Olympics. There he was stopped in the second round of the Featherweight (57 kg) division by Romania's Viorel Simion.  His olympic results were:
Defeated Likar Ramos Concha (Colombia) 32-18
Lost to Viorel Simion (Romania) 13-38

Biarnadski won a bronze medal in the same division six months earlier, at the 2004 European Amateur Boxing Championships in Pula, Croatia.

External links
Yahoo! Sports

1977 births
Living people
Featherweight boxers
Boxers at the 2004 Summer Olympics
Olympic boxers of Belarus
Belarusian male boxers
21st-century Belarusian people